The 2016 Campeonato Pernambucano (officially the 2016 Campeonato Pernambucano Celpe A1 for sponsorship reasons) was the 102nd edition of the state championship of Pernambuco. The championship began on January 10 and ended on May 8. Twelve teams were competing, ten returning from the 2015 and two promoted from the 2015 Pernambucano U-23 Championship (Belo Jardim and Vitória das Tabocas). Santa Cruz, the defending champions,  won the finals against Sport 1–0 on aggregate.

Teams

Tiebreakers
The teams are ranked according to points (3 points for a win, 1 point for a draw, 0 points for a loss). If two or more teams are equal on points on completion of the group matches, the following criteria are applied to determine the rankings:
Higher number of wins;
Superior goal difference;
Head-to-head result between tied teams;
Higher number of away wins;
Fewest home losses;
Draw in the headquarters of the Federação Pernambucana de Futebol.

First stage

Group A

Group B

Central, América and Serra Talhada qualified for 2016 Série D and 2017 Série D. Serra Talhada played the 2016 Série D but they declined to participate in the 2017 Série D. Their berth was used by Group A runners-up Atlético Pernambucano.

Relegation stage

Second stage

Play-offs

Semifinals

Semifinal 1

Santa Cruz won 5–2 on aggregate and advanced to the Finals.
Santa Cruz qualified for 2017 Copa do Brasil and 2017 Copa do Nordeste.

Semifinal 2

Tied 1–1 on aggregate, Sport won on penalties and advanced to the Finals.
Sport qualified for 2017 Copa do Brasil and 2017 Copa do Nordeste.

Third place matches

Náutico won 4–0 on aggregate.
Náutico qualified for 2017 Copa do Brasil and 2017 Copa do Nordeste.
Since Santa Cruz qualified for 2017 Copa do Brasil round of 16 as 2016 Copa do Nordeste champions, Salgueiro also qualified for 2017 Copa do Brasil.

Finals

References

Campeonato Pernambucano seasons
Pernambucano